Aspalathus cordicarpa is a species of flowering plant in the genus Aspalathus. Prior to its rediscovery in 2016, Aspalathus cordicarpa was last collected in 1950 and thought to be extinct. It is endemic to the Fynbos region around Garcia's Pass in the Western Cape. It is also known as the Heartfruit Capegorse.

Distribution 
Aspalathus cordicarpa is found around Garcia's Pass, in sands or sandstone gravel at mid altitudes.

Gallery

Conservation status 
As of the 2006 classification, Aspalathus cordicarpa is classified as Extinct. Alien species such as Acacia mearnsii are a severe past and present threat. Pine plantations are also a threat, as the area that Aspalathus cordicarpa is found in has been transformed into pine forestry.

References

External links 
 

Endemic flora of South Africa
Flora of South Africa
Flora of the Cape Provinces
Plants described in 1988
Crotalarieae